Bette MacDonald is a Canadian comedian, actress, and writer, best known for her comedic television series Rideau Hall.

A premier Atlantic Canadian comedian, she has been compared to Carol Burnett, John Candy and Bette Midler; described as a comic genius with impeccable timing, or as the Halifax Herald described: "To watch her is to be a deer caught in the headlights of comedic talent".

She is a winner of the Gemini Award.

MacDonald is married to fellow Maritime comedic writer and performer Maynard Morrison.

Credits 
 1984 – The Bay Boy – Nurse (as Betty MacDonald)
 1999 – New Waterford Girl – Fry Cook #2
 1999 – The Bette Show (TV series)
 2001 – Lexx (TV series)
 2001 – Liocracy (TV series)
 1998–2001 – Made in Canada (TV series)
 2002 – Rideau Hall – Regina Gallant
 2003–2004 – Halifax Comedy Festival (TV mini-series)
 2004 –Winnipeg Comedy Festival (TV series)
 2012–2018 – Mr. D – Trudy Walsh

References

External links 
 
 

Living people
Canadian film actresses
Canadian women comedians
Canadian people of Scottish descent
Canadian Screen Award winners
Canadian television actresses
Year of birth missing (living people)
Canadian stand-up comedians
20th-century Canadian actresses
20th-century Canadian comedians
21st-century Canadian actresses
21st-century Canadian comedians